The Community United Methodist Church is a historic United Methodist Church in Half Moon Bay, California. Originally the Methodist Episcopal Church at Half Moon Bay, it was built in 1872 and was added to the National Register of Historic Places in 1980.

It was damaged by the 1906 San Francisco earthquake, which shook it off its foundation.

References

External links

Churches in San Mateo County, California
United Methodist churches in California
Half Moon Bay, California
Churches completed in 1872
National Register of Historic Places in San Mateo County, California
Churches on the National Register of Historic Places in California
Carpenter Gothic church buildings in California